My Ship Sails, also called My Bird Sings, is an English card game for children that is played with a 52-card French pack. It appears related to the 17th-century gambling game, My Sow's Pigg'd. In 19th century Shropshire, the latter game went under the name of Wizzy, Wizzy, Wee; the aim was to collect cards of the same suit, the first to do so throwing their hand on the table and crying "My sow's pigged!" or "Wizzy, wizzy, wee!".

Rules
My Ship Sails may be played by four to seven players with a 52-card French-suited pack. The aim of the game is to be the first player to collect seven cards all of one suit.

Each player is dealt 7 cards and the rest are set aside. Players pick up their hand and discard one card to the table. When everyone has done that, each player picks up the discard on his right, which becomes part of his hand. The first player to collect 7 cards of the same suit, says "my ship sails" and lays her hand, face up, on the table. If two players go out simultaneously, there are two options for deciding the winner: either the first player to say "my ship sails" wins or the player with the highest ranking card wins.

Ochse, leg dich! 

Ochse, leg dich! ("Ox, lie down!") is a German and Austrian variant played with 32 French or German cards (Skat pack). It is a simple, family card game that is often played with children and is useful for learning the card values and card suits.

The aim of the game is to collect all eight cards of one suit. Dealer deals 8 cards to each of the four players. Forehand leads by passing a card of his choice to the player on his left - middlehand. Middlehand then passes a card to rearhand and so on in clockwise order. Play continues in this way until a player has collected all eight cards of one suit in his hand, whereupon he lays them face up on the table and declares "Ochse, leg dich!" or "Ox, lie down!"

The winner then receives as many chips or gaming counters from each other player as that player has fallen short in collecting eight cards of the same suit. For example, if a player has only collected five cards of one suit, he pays 3 chips to the winner.

References

Literature 
 Cavendish (1875). Round Games at Cards. London: de la Rue.
 Gööck, Roland (1967). Freude am Kartenspiel, Bertelsmann, Gütersloh
 Jackson, Georgina Frederica (1883). Shropshire Folk-Lore: A Sheaf of Gleanings, Vol. 1. ed. by Charlotte Sophia Burne. London: Trübner.
 Parlett, David (1991). A History of Card Games, OUP, Oxford. 
 Parlett, David (2008). The Penguin Book of Card Games, Penguin, London. 

Catch and collect games
English card games
French deck card games
German deck card games
Card games for children